Hallard Leo "Snow" White (27 March 1929 – 14 July 2016) was a New Zealand rugby union player. He was a member of the New Zealand national side, the All Blacks, from 1953 to 1955, appearing in 16 matches including four internationals. Following his retirement as a player, White served in both coaching and administrative roles: as assistant coach of Auckland; president of the Auckland Rugby Football Union from 1989 to 1989; and president of the New Zealand Rugby Union in 1990. He died of Alzheimer's disease in Auckland on 14 July 2016.

References

1929 births
2016 deaths
People from Kawakawa, New Zealand
People educated at Bay of Islands College
New Zealand rugby union players
New Zealand international rugby union players
Auckland rugby union players
Rugby union props
New Zealand rugby union coaches
New Zealand Rugby Football Union officials
Deaths from Alzheimer's disease